Janhitaila is a village in Dhenkanal district, Odisha, India.

Geography
Nearby villages include Gengutia, Barada, Asanabahali and Ranapasi.

Demography
According to the 2011 census of India, Janhitaila had a population of 264, spread among 58 households. The female population was 47.7%. The literacy rate was 78.0% for the whole village; female literacy was 69.0%.

References

Villages in Dhenkanal district